Mandeok-dong is a neighborhood in Buk-gu, southern Busan, South Korea, which is further divided into three dong, Mandeok-1-dong, Mandeok-2-dong and Mandeok-3-dong.

Transportation 
 Mandeok Station of

Tourist attraction 

 Mandeoksa Temple Site

See also
 Administrative divisions of South Korea

References

External links
 Mandeok-1-dong resident office website
 Mandeok-2-dong resident office website
 Mandeok-3-dong resident office website

Buk District, Busan
Neighbourhoods in Busan